Shaoshan Township is a rural township in Shaoshan City, Hunan Province, China.

History
In 2015, Daping Township was merged into Shaoshan Township.

Administrative division
The township is divided into 21 villages: 
 Shaoshan Village
 Shaoyuan Village
 Shaobei Village
 Tiepi Village
 Shaoguang Village
 Zhuji Village
 Guyang Village
 Shitang Village
 Huaqiao Village
 Shaoxi Village
 Shaodong Village
 Chengqian Village
 Xinhu Village
 Xiangshao Village
 Shaoxin Village
 Huangtian Village
 Shaofeng Village
 Meihua Village
 Linjiawan Village
 Daping Village
 Xinlian Village

Education
There are two junior high schools and three primary schools located with the town.

Attractions
Former Residence of Mao Zedong and Dishui Hole are famous scenic spots.

Gallery

References

External links

Divisions of Shaoshan
Townships of Hunan